Laurette is a female given name, a diminutive of the name Laura.

People with this name
Laurette, wife of 12th century European nobleman Henry IV, Count of Luxembourg
Laurette, daughter of 12th century European nobleman Baldwin IV, Count of Hainaut
Laurette, the model for Matisse painting The Painter and His Model
Laurette de Commercy, wife of 13th century European nobleman John, Count of Chalon
Laurette Marcia Laura Gemser (born 1950), Indonesian-Dutch actress, model and costume designer
Laurette Goldberg (1932–2005), founder of the Philharmonia Baroque Orchestra in San Francisco
Laurette Koellner, American business executive
Laurette de Looz, wife of 12th century European nobleman Theobald I, Count of Bar
Laurette Luez (1928–1999), American actress and model
Laurette Maritz (born 1964), South African professional golfer
Laurette Onkelinx (born 1958), Belgian politician
Laurette Huggins Reviere (died 1992), American victim of serial killer Nathaniel White
Laurette Séjourné (1911–2003), Mexican archeologist and ethnologist
Laurette Spang-McCook (born 1951), American television actress
Laurette Stivers, British-based American singer-songwriter
Laurette Taylor (1883–1946), American stage and silent film star
Laurette Tuckerman (born 1956), French and American mathematical physicist

Fictional characters
Laurette, title character in 18th-century English gothic novel The Orphan of the Rhine
Laurette, in 19th-century French novel Servitude et grandeur militaires
Laurette, in Belgian opéra comique Richard Coeur-de-lion
Laurette, in French opéra comique La chanson de Fortunio
Laurette, in Italian opéra comique Le peintre amoureux de son modèle (not about Matisse)
Laurette, in French opérette Le docteur Miracle
Laurette, in 1941 American novel What Makes Sammy Run?
Laurette Fillbrandt, in American radio soap opera Girl Alone
Laurette de Latour, in 1955 swashbuckler film The Purple Mask
Laurette Sincee, in 1946 American play Another Part of the Forest
Laurette Wilder, in 1995 film In the Name of Love: A Texas Tragedy

See also
Loretta
Madame Laurette Messimy, in List of rose cultivars named after people

Feminine given names